Anelaphus curacaoensis is a species of beetle in the family Cerambycidae. It was described by Gilmour in 1968.

References

Anelaphus
Beetles described in 1968